P and R measures are the statistics used to evaluate the efficiency and effectiveness of business processes, particularly automated business processes.

The P measures are the process measures – these statistics that record the number of times things occur. Examples include:
 the number of times an error loop is used
 the number of times an approval loop is used
 the average time to complete a particular task in the process
and show how efficient the process is.

The R measures are the results measures – these statistics record the 'outcomes' of the process. Examples include:
 the number of occasions when the process completed correctly
 the number of times rejections occurred
 the number of times approval was not given
and show how effective the process is.

Business process management